Trinity Bridge is a three-way footbridge which crosses the River Irwell and links the two cities of Manchester and Salford in Greater Manchester, England. It was designed by renowned Spanish architect, Santiago Calatrava and was completed in 1995. It was one of Calatrava's earliest bridge works and remains the only project he has completed in the United Kingdom.

History
Trinity Bridge was designed by Spanish architect Santiago Calatrava, and was one of his earliest bridge works. The bridge has a typical Calatrava design utilising straight white lines as a structure, and is dominated by the rotund pylon which rises to 41m. The bridge crosses the River Irwell, which marks the boundary between Manchester and Salford. The bridge was re-painted and examined in 2010 as part of the 15-year maintenance programme.

References

Bridges in Greater Manchester
Three-way bridges
Neo-futurism architecture
Bridges completed in 1995
Pedestrian bridges in England
Bridges across the River Irwell
Bridges by Santiago Calatrava